Elsayyed ElBadawi Mosque is the largest mosque in the northern city of Tanta, Egypt. It is a Sunni Sufi mosque and contains the tomb of Ahmad al-Badawi.

History
The mosque was built by the student and successor of Al-Badawi, Abdel-Al.

The mosque enjoyed a makeover in the era of former President Anwar Sadat, in 1975, and another makeover by the year 2005.

See also
  Lists of mosques 
  List of mosques in Africa
  List of mosques in Egypt 
 Ibrahim El-Desouki

Notes

Carnival in Tanta, BBC

Mosques in Egypt
Sufi mosques
Sufism in Egypt
Mosque buildings with domes
Buildings and structures in Gharbia Governorate